Jessica R. Williams or Jessica Allain (born 17 February 1991) is an English actress and model. She starred in the slasher film Thriller (2018). Her other films include The Laundromat (2019), Texas Chainsaw Massacre (2022), and Fear (2023).

Early life
Allain is from London. She was born to a Barbadian father and a Saint Lucian mother. She attended the Sylvia Young Theatre School. She began her career in modeling when she was sixteen.

Career
In 2015, Allain made both her television and feature film debuts with small roles in an episode of the Sky One sitcom Yonderland as well as the films Mission: Impossible - Rogue Nation and Eddie the Eagle. She also appeared in the music video for "Catch Me If You Can" by Walking on Cars. Allain landed her first leading role as Lisa Walker in the 2018 slasher film Thriller. The following year, she played Simone in Steven Soderbergh's comedy-drama film The Laundromat about the Panama Papers. She had a small role in the independent superhero film Archenemy.

In 2022, Allain played Catherine in the ninth installment of the Texas Chainsaw Massacre franchise on Netflix. Allain appeared in the horror film Fear and the miniseries The Continental, a three-part John Wick spin-off set to be released on Peacock and Amazon Prime.

Filmography

Film

Television

Music videos
 "Catch Me If You Can" (2015), Walking on Cars

References

External links
 
 Jessica Allain at Independent Talent

Living people
1997 births
Actresses from London
Alumni of the Sylvia Young Theatre School
Black British actresses
English film actresses
English people of Barbadian descent
English people of Saint Lucian descent
Models from London